Yellow Matter Custard was a Beatles tribute supergroup consisting of Mike Portnoy, Neal Morse, Paul Gilbert and Matt Bissonette. Kasim Sulton played bass with the band in 2011, replacing Bissonette.

They take their name from a line in "I Am the Walrus", by the Beatles: "Yellow matter custard, dripping from a dead dog's eye".

Ty Tabor (King's X) was originally approached to play guitar for the group, but was unable due to the King's X touring schedule.

Conceived as more of a project than a band, they have only performed a total of five times: twice in 2003 (May 17 at Upper Montclair, New Jersey and May 18 at B.B. King's Blues Club, New York), and three times in 2011. Due to scheduling conflicts, Matt Bissonette was unable to play with the band in 2011, and thus was replaced by Kasim Sulton.

Members
Former members Mike Portnoy - drums, vocals
 Neal Morse - keyboards, guitars, fuzz bass, vocals
 Paul Gilbert - lead guitars, vocals, harmonica
 Matt Bissonette - bass, vocals (2003)
 Kasim Sulton - bass, vocals (2011)Additional players'
 Bert Baldwin - keyboards, percussion, samples

Discography

One Night in New York City

 Two CD/DVD
 Recorded May 18, 2003
 CD released 2003
 DVD released 2005

 "Magical Mystery Tour"
 "Dear Prudence"
 "Dig a Pony"
 "She Said She Said"
 "I Call Your Name"
 "You Can't Do That"
 "When I Get Home"
 "Nowhere Man"
 "Rain"
 "Free as a Bird"
 "Come Together"
 "I Am the Walrus"
 "While My Guitar Gently Weeps"
 "Baby's in Black"
 "I'll Be Back"
 "No Reply"
 "The Night Before"
 "You're Gonna Lose That Girl"
 "Ticket to Ride"
 "Everybody's Got Something to Hide Except Me and My Monkey"
 "Oh! Darling"
 "Think For Yourself"
 "Wait"
 "Revolution"
 "I Want You (She's So Heavy)"
 "You Know My Name (Look Up the Number)"
 "Lovely Rita"
 "Good Morning Good Morning"
 "Sgt. Pepper's Lonely Hearts Club Band" (reprise)
 "A Day in the Life"

DVD bonus features

 Yellow Matter Custard Rehearsals
 Pre-Show Backstage

One More Night in New York City

 Recorded: February 28, 2011
 Two CD/DVD released 2011

 "Back in the USSR"
 "I Got a Feeling"
 "And Your Bird Can Sing"
 "Day Tripper"
 "Getting Better"
 "Taxman"
 "It Won't Be Long"
 "You've Really Got a Hold On Me"
 "Lady Madonna"
 "We Can Work It Out"
 "I'm a Loser"
 "I Don't Want To Spoil the Party"
 "Penny Lane"
 "The Fool on the Hill"
 "You've Got to Hide Your Love Away"
 "Things We Said Today"
 "If I Needed Someone"
 "It's Only Love"
 "She's a Woman"
 "The Word"
 "Any Time at All"
 "Paperback Writer"
 "Don't Let Me Down"
 "I'm So Tired"
 "Savoy Truffle"
 "Glass Onion"
 "Yer Blues"
 "Helter Skelter"
 "Flying"
 "Because"
 "You Never Give Me Your Money"
 "Sun King"
 "Mean Mr. Mustard"
 "Her Majesty"
 "Polythene Pam"
 "She Came In Through the Bathroom Window"
 "Golden Slumbers"
 "Carry That Weight"
 "The End"

DVD bonus features

 Interview with Mike Portnoy & Paul Gilbert (25:23)
 Rehearsal footage (38:16)

References

Rock music groups from New York (state)
The Beatles tribute bands
Musical groups established in 2003